Frank Gruber (born February 2, 1904, Elmer, Minnesota, died December 9, 1969, Santa Monica, California) was an American writer. He was a writer of stories for pulp fiction magazines. He also wrote dozens of novels, mostly Westerns and detective stories. Gruber wrote many scripts for Hollywood movies and television shows and was the creator of three TV series. He sometimes wrote under the pen names Stephen Acre, Charles K. Boston and John K. Vedder.

Career

Gruber said that as a nine-year-old newsboy, he read his first book, Luke Walton, the Chicago Newsboy by Horatio Alger. During the next seven years he read a hundred more Alger books and said they influenced him professionally more than anything else in his life. They told how poor boys became rich, but what they instilled in Gruber was an ambition, at age nine or ten, to be an author. He had written his first book before age 11, using a pencil on wrapping paper.

Age 13 or 14, his ambition died for a while but several years later it rose again and he started submitting stories to various magazines, like Smart Set and Atlantic Monthly. Getting rejected, he lowered his sights to The Saturday Evening Post and Colliers, with no more success. The pulps were getting noticed and Gruber tried those but with no success. As a story came back with a rejection slip, he would post it off again to someone else, so he could have as many as 40 stories going back and forth at different times, costing him about a third of his earnings in postage. Erle Stanley Gardner called him the fighter who licked his weight in rejection slips.

Gruber served in the US Army from 1920-1921. Gruber said that, while in the Army, he learned how to manipulate the dice to throw 35 consecutive sevens, but that he had "lost this skill through lack of practice".

February 1927, he finally sold a story. It was bought by The United Brethren Publishing House of Dayton. It was called "The Two Dollar Raise" and he got a cheque through for three dollars and fifty cents.

Answering an ad in The Chicago Tribune, he got a job editing a small farm paper. In September he got a better paid job in Iowa and soon found himself editing five farm papers. He had much money and even wrote some articles for the papers but found he had no time to write the stories he wanted to write.

In 1932 the Depression hit, and he lost his job. 1932 to 1934 were his bad years. He wrote and wrote, many stories typed out on an old "Remington" but of the Sunday School stories, the spicy sex stories, the detective stories, the sports stories, the love stories, very few sold, with some companies paying him as little as a quarter of a cent per word. He had a few successes and remained in Mt. Morris, Illinois for 14 months before deciding to head to New York on July 1, 1934.

There were numerous publishing houses in New York and he could save money on postage but this led to him walking miles to deliver manuscripts as he had so little money, not even enough for food most of the time. He stayed in a room in the Forty Fourth Street Hotel ($10.50 per week).

In his book, The Pulp Jungle (1967), Gruber details the struggles (for a long time, at least once a day he had tomato soup, which was free hot water in a bowl, with free crackers crumbled in and half a bottle of tomato sauce added) he had for a few years and numerous fellow authors he became friendly with, many of whom were famous or later became famous.

Early December 1934 and with endless rejection slips, he got a phone call from Rogers Terrill. Could he do a 5,500 word filler story for Operator #5 pulp magazine by next day? He did and got paid. Even better, they wanted another one next month, and another. He was then asked to do a filler for Ace Sports pulp, which sold. Gruber's income from writing in 1934 was under $400. In 1935, his stories were suddenly wanted and he earned $10,000 that year. His wife came to live with him (she had been living with relatives) and he lived the good life, moving into a big apartment and buying a Buick ($750).

January 1942, Gruber decided to try Hollywood, having heard about the huge sums some stories sold for and stayed there till 1946.

Gruber—who stated that only seven types of Westerns existed—wrote more than 300 stories for over 40 pulp magazines, as well as more than 60 novels, which had sold more than 90 million copies in 24 countries, sixty five screenplays, and a hundred television scripts.  25 of his books have sold to motion pictures, and he created three TV series: Tales of Wells Fargo, The Texan and Shotgun Slade. His first novel, The Peace Marshall, which was rejected by every agent in New York at the time, became a film called The Kansan, starting Richard Dix. The book has been reprinted many times with total sales of over one million copies.

He bragged that he could write a complete mystery novel in 16 days and then use the other 14 days of the month to knock out a historical serial for a magazine. His mystery novels included The French Key (for which he sold the motion picture rights for $14,000 in 1945) and The Laughing Fox.

He was a social drinker in the thirties (regular parties for authors were alcohol only with no food provided), being too busy to become a hard drinker, but later just about gave up alcohol.

Filmography

Films

Television

Novels

Johnny Fletcher series
 The French Key aka Once Over Deadly (1940) (filmed in 1946)
 The Laughing Fox (1940)
 The Hungry Dog aka Die Like a Dog (1941)
 The Navy Colt (1941)
 The Talking Clock (1941)
 The Gift Horse aka Heir to Homicide (1942)
 The Mighty Blockhead aka The Corpse Moved Upstairs (1942)
 The Silver Tombstone aka The Silver Tombstone Mystery (1945)
 The Honest Dealer aka Double Dealer (1947)
 The Whispering Master (1947)
 The Scarlet Feather aka The Gamecock Murder (1948)
 The Leather Duke aka A Job of Murder (1949)
 The Limping Goose (1954)
 The Corpse Moved Upstairs (1964)
 Swing Low Swing Dead (1964)

Simon Lash series
 Simon Lash, Private Detective (1941) (filmed in 1946 as Accomplice)
 The Buffalo Box aka The Murder Box (1942)
 Murder '97 aka The Long Arm of Murder (1948)

Otis Beagle series
 Beagle Scented Murder aka Market for Murder (1946)
 The Lonesome Badger aka Mood for Murder (1954)

Other works 
 The Silver Jackass (1941)
 The Last Doorbell aka Kiss the Boss Goodbye (1941)
 The Yellow Overcoat aka Fall Guy for a Killer (1942)
 The Last Doorbell (1946)
 The Fourth Letter (1947)
 The Lock and the Key aka Run, Thief, Run (1948)
 Broken Lance (1949)
 The Lone Gunhawk aka Smoky Road (1949)
 Death on Post No. 7 (1951)
 Fort Starvation (1953)
 Quantrell's Raiders (1953)
 Rebel Road aka Outlaw (1953)
 Bitter Sage (1954)
 Johnny Vengeance (1954)
 Ride to Hell (1955)
 Buffalo Grass aka The Big Land (1956)
 The Man From Missouri (1956)
 The Highway Man (1956)
 Billy the Kid (1957)
 Lonesome River (1957)
 Peace Marshal (1957)
 Town Tamer (1957)
 The Marshal (1958)
 The Bushwhackers (1959)
 Bugles West (1961)
 Twenty Plus Two (1961)
 Brothers of Silence (1962)
 Bridge of Sand (1963)
 The Greek Affair (1964)
 Little Hercules (1965)
 The Pulp Jungle (1967)
 This Gun Is Still (1967)
 The Twilight Man (1967)
 The Dawn Riders (1968)
 The Gold Gap (1968)
 The Curly Wolf (1969)
 The Etruscan Bull (1969)
 The Spanish Prisoner (1969)
 Wanted (1971)
 Bitter Sage and the Bushwhackers (1984)

See also
List of Ace western double titles

References

External links

Biography of Frank Gruber, with lists of works at The Thrilling Detective website

1904 births
1969 deaths
20th-century American novelists
American male novelists
American television writers
American male screenwriters
Western (genre) writers
American crime fiction writers
American mystery writers
American male short story writers
American male television writers
20th-century American short story writers
20th-century American male writers
20th-century American screenwriters